Dynastes satanas, the Satanas beetle, is a species of beetle belonging to the family Scarabaeidae; the name is sometimes misspelled as "satanus".

Because of collecting and habitat loss this rare species is protected and included in the list of insects regulated by the Convention on International Trade in Endangered Species of Wild Fauna and Flora (CITES).

Description
The males have one large horn on the pronotum, with a dense reddish pubescence on the underside of the horn. A smaller horn arises from the head. Body, pronotum and elytra are black in both sexes. In the females the clypeus is narrowly rounded at apex.

Life cycle
These beetles have a biennial life cycle. Females lay 25-40 eggs, hatching in about two months. Larval stages last about 1.5–2 years. The larvae feed on dead tree trunks, while the adults feed on fruits, sap and nectar.

Distribution
This species is endemic to Bolivia.

Bibliography
 Moser J. (1909) Eine neue Dynastes-Art, Deutsche entomologische Zeitschrift :112
 Scarabs: World Scarabaeidae Database. Schoolmeesters P., 2011-05-30

References

Dynastinae
Beetles of South America
Beetles described in 1909
Fauna of Bolivia
Insects of South America